Serra de Tramuntana-Costa Nord is a Spanish geographical indication for Vino de la Tierra wines located on the north coast of the island of Mallorca in the autonomous region of the Balearic Islands, Spain. Vino de la Tierra is one step below the mainstream Denominación de Origen indication on the Spanish wine quality ladder.

18 municipalities are covered by the region, around 40 hectares and 5 wineries (bodegas) are registered with the Regulatory Body.

It acquired its Vino de la Tierra status in 2007.

Grape varieties
 Red: Cabernet Sauvignon, Merlot, Syrah, Monastrell, Tempranillo, Callet and Manto negro
 White: Malvasía, Moscatel, Moll, Parellada, Macabeo, Chardonnay and Sauvignon blanc

External links
 Vino de la tierra de Formentera Página del Institut de Qualitat Agroalimentaria de las Islas Baleares

Spanish wine
Wine regions of Spain
Wine-related lists
Appellations